Eidi Mordeh-ye Pain (also Romanized as ʿEīdī Mordeh-ye Pā’īn) is a village in Ahmadfedaleh Rural District, Sardasht District, Dezful County, Khuzestan Province, Iran. At the 2006 census, its population was 88, in 14 families.

References 

Populated places in Dezful County